Sulfinic acids are oxoacids of sulfur with the structure RSO(OH). In these organosulfur compounds, sulfur is pyramidal.

Structure and properties
Sulfinic acids RSO2H are about 1000x more acidic than the corresponding carboxylic acid RCO2H.  Sulfur is pyramidal, consequently sulfinic acids are chiral.

Preparation
They are often prepared in situ by acidification of the corresponding sulfinate salts, which are typically more robust than the acid. These salts are generated by reduction of sulfonyl chlorides. An alternative route is the reaction of Grignard reagents with sulfur dioxide. Transition metal sulfinates are also generated by insertion of sulfur dioxide into metal alkyls, a reaction that may proceed via a metal sulfur dioxide complex. Unsubstituted sulfinic acid, when R is the hydrogen atom, is a higher energy isomer of sulfoxylic acid, both of which are unstable.

Examples

An example of a simple, well-studied sulfinic acid is phenylsulfinic acid. A commercially important sulfinic acid is thiourea dioxide, which is prepared by the oxidation of thiourea with hydrogen peroxide.
(NH2)2CS + 2H2O2 → (NH)(NH2)CSO2H + 2H2O

Another commercially important sulfinic acid is hydroxymethyl sulfinic acid, which is usually employed as its sodium salt (HOCH2SO2Na). Called Rongalite, this anion is also commercially useful as a reducing agent.

Sulfinates
The conjugate base of a sulfinic acid is a sulfinate anion.  The enzyme cysteine dioxygenase converts cysteine into the corresponding sulfinate.  One product of this catabolic reaction is the sulfinic acid hypotaurine.  Sulfinite also describes esters of sulfinic acid.  Cyclic sulfinite esters are called sultines.

References

External links
 
 Diagram at ucalgary.ca
 Diagram at acdlabs.com

Functional groups